In Cornish folklore, the Owlman, sometimes referred to as the Cornish Owlman, or the Owlman of Mawnan, is an owl-like humanoid creature said to have been seen in 1976 in the village of Mawnan, Cornwall, UK. The Owlman is sometimes compared to the American Mothman legend from the mid 1960s; however, a Eurasian eagle-owl is likely the source of the legend.

History
The story originated when Tony "Doc" Shiels claimed to have investigated a report of two young girls on holiday in Mawnan who saw a large winged creature hovering above the tower of St Mawnan and St Stephen's Church, Mawnan on 17 April 1976. According to most versions of the story, the girls, identified as June and Vicky Melling, were so frightened by the sight of a large "feathered bird-man" that their father Don immediately cut short their family holiday after hearing their tale. According to Shiels, one of the girls provided him with a drawing of the creature, which he dubbed "Owlman".

The story was subsequently related in a pamphlet entitled Morgawr: The Monster of Falmouth Bay by Anthony Mawnan-Peller, which circulated throughout Cornwall in 1976. According to Shiels, "Owlman" was reported again on 3 July by two 14-year-old girls identified as Sally Chapman and Barbara Perry, who were aware of the "Owlman" tale. According to the story, the two girls were camping when they were confronted by "a big owl with pointed ears, as big as a man" with glowing eyes and black, pincer-like claws.

Sporadic claims of "Owlman" sightings in the vicinity of the church circulated in 1978, 1979, 1989, and 1995, and according to legend, a "loud, owl-like sound" could be heard at night in the Mullion church yard during the year 2000.

Explanation
 
According to author Joe Nickell, church towers are common nesting places for barn owls, which were likely the source of the sightings. Author and Fortean TV presenter Reverend Lionel Fanthorpe also identifies the sighting of a Eurasian eagle-owl as a likely source of the legend.

Occult historian Gareth Medway suggested that the whole thing may have been a hoax by Shiels, who had a reputation for hoaxing. Medway noted that witnesses claiming encounters with a similar legendary monster promoted by Shiels "were either Doc Shiels, or friends of Doc Shiels, or relatives of Doc Shiels, or reported their sightings to Doc Shiels (and to no one else), or else wrote letters describing what they had seen to newspapers and were never interviewed by anyone."

In popular culture
 
 In 2009, the episode "Death Raptor" focused on the Owlman in the Animal Planet TV series Lost Tapes. 
 "The Owlman Feeds at Midnight" is an episode in Season 1 of the children's TV show The Secret Saturdays. The plot of the episode involves a town terrorised by an Owlman.
The 2012 play 'Horse Piss for Blood' written by Carl Grose, features the Owlman as a key plot point.
 The Owlman is depicted in the 2013 Scottish independent horror film Lord of Tears. In this film, The Owlman represents the Semitic god Muloch.

See also

 Eurasian eagle-owl
 Morgawr (folklore)
 Mothman
 Spring Heeled Jack

References

Books 
  (pp135–139, 141)
 
  (pp150–153)

Cornwall
English folklore
Cornish legendary creatures